Édouard Dessommes (New Orleans, November 17, 1845 – Mandeville, 1908) was an American French language writer.

Born in New Orleans, he went to a French school in Paris when he was 14 years old, following the custom of Louisiana Creoles, and in order to escape from American Civil War. He studied medicine and later started to publish his books. He was a professor at the Tulane University, but disappointed because of his literacy failure, he chose to live as a hermit in Mandeville.

Works
Femme et Statue, 1869
Jacques Morel, 1870
Comptes Rendus, 1891

External links
 Biography

1845 births
1908 deaths
American male writers
Writers from New Orleans
American writers in French
Tulane University faculty
People from Mandeville, Louisiana